Cardinal Power Plant is a 1.8-gigawatt (1,800 MW) coal power plant located south of Brilliant, Ohio in Jefferson County, Ohio. The power plant has three units. Cardinal is co-owned with Unit 1 owned by American Electric Power's (AEP) subsidiary, AEP Generation Resources. Units 2–3 are owned by Buckeye Power, a utility cooperative. It began operations in 1967.

History
Construction of Cardinal started in November 1963. The project was a joint venture of Ohio Power (a forerunner of AEP) and Buckeye Power. Buckeye Power obtained loans from the Rural Electric Administration and financing through Kuhn, Loeb & Co. and the Ohio Company. Cardinal was built adjacent to Ohio Power's Tidd Plant. The plant is named after the State Bird of Ohio, the cardinal. Units 1 and 2 began commercial generation in 1967 at a cost of $131 million. Unit 3 began generation in 1977 after six years of construction at a cost of $220 million. In 2017, AEP and Buckeye Power reached an agreement for Buckeye Power to operate all three units at Cardinal.

Environmental mitigation
To further reduce nitrogen oxide emissions, AEP and Buckeye Power announced in 2001 they would install selective catalytic reduction (SCR) systems to complement their LO-NOx burners at Cardinal. The SCRs would decrease  emissions at the plant from 30% to 90%. Between 2005 and 2010, flue-gas desulfurization (FGD) equipment were installed to all three units at Cardinal with Units 1 and 2 costing $300 million to construct. The FGD equipment would reduce sulfur dioxide emissions by 98%. A year after it was installed, inspectors found severe corrosion in its tank vessel. AEP negotiated a settlement with Black & Veatch, the contractor who installed the FGD equipment, to address the corrosion. Instead of constructing a new chimney for Unit 3's FGD system, AEP retrofitted a cooling tower to release waste heat into the atmosphere.  AEP announced in 2015 that its Cardinal unit will be converted into a natural gas power plant by 2030 in order to comply with Environmental Protection Agency (EPA) standards. The Public Utilities Commission of Ohio (PUCO) approved of the conversion.

Incidents
During construction in June 1965, three workers were killed when a pump casing fell into a well.

An explosion killed one worker and injured four in June 1984.

See also

 List of power stations in Ohio

References

External links

 Cardinal Plant Information

Energy infrastructure completed in 1967
Energy infrastructure completed in 1977
Buildings and structures in Jefferson County, Ohio
Coal-fired power stations in Ohio